Balder is a surname. Notable people with the surname include:

Hugo Egon Balder (born 1950), German television presenter, producer, and comedian
Rob Balder (born 1969), American cartoonist and singer-songwriter
Tine Balder (1924–2021), Belgian actress

See also
 Balder (disambiguation)